Lomé Agreement may refer to:

 The Lomé Convention 
 An agreement in the First Liberian Civil War